James William Murdoch (June 15, 1904 – April 28, 1984) was Speaker of the Legislative Assembly of Ontario from 1960 to 1963. He served as the Progressive Conservative MPP for Essex South from his election in 1943 until his defeat in 1963.

He was born in Leeds, England, the son of James Murdoch and Elizabeth Mary Hole, and was educated in England. Murdoch came to Canada, where he became a farmer, in 1923. In 1932, he married Marie Bondy. Murdoch served on the local school board and was treasurer on the municipal council for Harrow, Ontario. Murdoch was defeated when he ran for reelection in 1963. From 1968 to 1971 and from 1974 to 1976, he served on Amherstburg town council. He died in 1984 in Amherstburg. He is buried at Colchester Memorial Cemetery, Colchester, Ontario.

References

External links

1904 births
1984 deaths
Progressive Conservative Party of Ontario MPPs
Speakers of the Legislative Assembly of Ontario
British emigrants to Canada